The Girl from Manhattan is a 1948 American comedy drama film directed by Alfred E. Green, starring Dorothy Lamour, George Montgomery, and Charles Laughton.

The guest house setting allows a multiplicity of characters to interact with the main characters.

Plot

New York actress and fashion model Carol arrives to stay with her uncle Homer Purdy in a boarding house in the mid-west America town of Pittsfield.

Meanwhile, ex-football player, the handsome Tom Walker, appears in the same state to chat with the bishop regarding his becoming a minister in the town. It is concluded that the church needs new heroes and his background as a  football star should be a benefit not a hindrance. The bishop has arranged for him to stay at Purdy's boarding house. On arrival he meets Carol and they recognise each other. Tom is cryptic about his plans.

Tom meets the church council who present a local benefactor Mr Birch who is going to buy the 150-year-old church and build a new church closer to the town centre: the chosen site is Purdy's boarding House.

Uncle Homer is revealed to be giving most of his rooms free until the various residents get rich, and is involved in many of their madcap schemes. He makes little money and the old house is crumbling. Carol and Homer rearrange one of the rooms to serve as Tom's study until the new church is built. They do not know the chosen site is their house.

The bishop calls in Tom to discuss his reputation if being seen with a fashion model.

Oscar, one of the more eccentric guests, is allowed to build a miniature railway in Purdy's basement. Mr Birch appears at the boarding house to assess its demolition. Everyone knows the plan except Carol. Uncle Homer has squandered the $3,000 Carol sent him on investing in his guests crazy ventures. The train engine blows up and Homer is injured. Tom and carol join forces to save the boarding house. Several guests also start to raise money.

Ultimately Rev Tom sends his own $3,000 to pay off Homer's debts and Mr Birch's "generous" offer for the old church is proven to be a scam. Although they will need to keep using the old church, the bishop approves.

Cast

Dorothy Lamour as Carol Maynard
George Montgomery as Rev. Tom Walker
Charles Laughton as The Bishop
Ernest Truex as Homer Purdy
Hugh Herbert as Aaron Goss
Constance Collier as Mrs. Brooke
William Frawley as Mr. Bernouti
Sara Allgood as Mrs. Beeler, the bishop's cook
Frank Orth as Oscar Newsome
Howard Freeman as Sam Griffin
Raymond Largay as Wilbur J. Birch
George Chandler as Monty the taxi driver
Selmer Jackson as Dr. Moseby
Adeline De Walt Reynolds as Old Woman
Maurice Cass as Mr. Merkle
Eddy Waller as Jim Allison

References

External links

1948 films
1948 comedy films
1940s romantic comedy-drama films
American black-and-white films
American romantic comedy-drama films
Films directed by Alfred E. Green
Films scored by Heinz Roemheld
United Artists films
1940s English-language films
1940s American films